Peebles Island State Park is a  state park located at the confluence of the Mohawk and Hudson rivers in New York. A majority of the park is located in Saratoga County, with a smaller portion located in Albany County.

Description
Peebles Island State Park includes hiking and cross-country ski trails, as well as earthworks dating from the Revolutionary War and a visitors' center detailing the island's industrial history. The park also offers picnic tables with pavilions, river views, and fishing access.

In addition to encompassing the entirety of Peebles Island, the park also includes the Matton Shipyard on neighboring Van Schaick Island in the city of Cohoes.

Headquarters for New York State's Bureau of Historic Sites as well as the Bureau of Historic Preservation Field Services are located within the park. Contained within a converted factory complex on the island known as the Peebles Island Resource Center, the headquarters serve as a home to conservators, archaeologists, historians and others tasked with preserving historic locations within New York.

See also
 List of New York state parks

References

External links
 
 New York State Parks: Peebles Island State Park
 New York State Bureau of Historic Sites

State parks of New York (state)
Parks in Saratoga County, New York
Parks in Albany County, New York
Historic districts on the National Register of Historic Places in New York (state)
National Register of Historic Places in Albany County, New York